Rochester Township is one of eight townships in Fulton County, Indiana. As of the 2010 census, its population was 10,181 and it contained 4,838 housing units.

Geography

Cities and towns
 Rochester (the county seat)

Unincorporated towns
 Big Hill
 Green Oak
 Mount Zion
 Pershing
(This list is based on USGS data and may include former settlements.)

Adjacent townships
 Richland Township (north)
 Newcastle Township (northeast)
 Henry Township (east)
 Allen Township, Miami County (southeast)
 Liberty Township (south)
 Wayne Township (southwest)
 Union Township (west)
 Aubbeenaubbee Township (northwest)

Major highways
  U.S. Route 31
  Indiana State Road 14
  Indiana State Road 25

Cemeteries
The township contains five cemeteries: Antioch, Citizens, Independent Order of Odd Fellows, Mount Zion and Old Shelton.

References
 United States Census Bureau cartographic boundary files
 U.S. Board on Geographic Names

External links
 Indiana Township Association
 United Township Association of Indiana

Townships in Fulton County, Indiana
Townships in Indiana